Westnewton is a small hamlet comprising around 8 houses and a manse to the west of the village of Kirknewton, in the county of Northumberland, England. In 1951 the civil parish had a population of 42. It was formerly a separate parish, and was merged into the parish of Kirknewton on 1 April 1955.

Governance 
Westnewton is in the parliamentary constituency of Berwick-upon-Tweed.

References

External links

Hamlets in Northumberland
Former civil parishes in Northumberland
Kirknewton, Northumberland